Chris Schlenker (born 9 July 1984) is a Canadian ice hockey referee, currently working in the National Hockey League. He has worn sweater number 3 since being promoted to the NHL before the start of the 2018-19 season; prior to the promotion, he wore 48.

Playing career
Schlenker made his junior playing debut with the St. Albert Saints of the Alberta Junior Hockey League in 2000, playing in three games before making the jump up to the Western Hockey League during the 2000-01 season. He joined the Regina Pats, and played his first game on 1 December 2000, when Regina played against the Brandon Wheat Kings. It would be the only game he would play that season, as he was sent to the Alberta Midget Hockey League to play for the MLAC Maple Leafs.

He would be a part of the Pats roster until 2003-04, when he was sent to the Prince Albert Raiders in a January trade. At the time of the trade, he was the captain of Regina. Schlenker would remain with the Raiders until the end of the 2004-05 season.

In 2005, he signed with the Stuttgart Wizards of the German Oberliga, playing 11 games in his lone season in the league.

International tournaments
In 2002, Schlenker was named to Canada's inaugural roster for the U18s.

Officiating career

Western Hockey League
In 2012, Schlenker rejoined the WHL, coming onboard as a referee.

He was named as one of the five referees who would work in the 2016 Memorial Cup, held in Red Deer, Alberta. He also received the Allen Paradice Memorial Trophy in 2016 as the WHL's top official from that season.

American Hockey League
Schlenker was hired by the American Hockey League before the start of the 2015-16 season. His first regular-season game came on 17 October 2015, in a game between the Albany Devils and Toronto Marlies in Toronto, Ontario.

His first regular-season game in the AHL while being on a minor-league deal was on 14 October 2016, as the St. John's IceCaps faced off against the Hartford Wolf Pack in Hartford, Connecticut.

During his tenure in the AHL, Schlenker worked the Calder Cup finals in 2017 and 2018.

National Hockey League
Prior to the 2016-17 season, Schlenker was hired by the NHL on a minor-league contract. He worked his first regular-season game on 24 October 2016, in a game between the Philadelphia Flyers and Montreal Canadiens.

Schlenker was promoted to the full-time officiating roster before the start of the 2018-19 NHL season, after working 59 games in parts of two seasons. His first game as a full-time NHL official came on 3 October 2019, when the Anaheim Ducks faced off against the San Jose Sharks.

Personal life
Upon retiring from his playing career, Schlenker joined the Medicine Hat Police Service. He stayed onboard for ten years, leaving when he joined the NHL.

Notes

References

External links

1984 births
Living people
Canadian ice hockey officials
National Hockey League officials
Canadian ice hockey players
St. Albert Saints players
Regina Pats players
Prince Albert Raiders players
Oberliga (ice hockey) players
Canadian expatriate ice hockey players in Germany
Sportspeople from Medicine Hat
Ice hockey people from Alberta